Tongji Lu Station is a metro station on the Guangfo Line (FMetro Line 1). It is located under the junction of Fenjiang Middle Road and Tongji Road in the Chancheng District of Foshan. The station is near the business areas of Jihua Road and the Foshan Ancestral Temple, and there are many leisure and entertainment facilities nearby. It was completed on 3November 2010.

Station layout

Exits

References

Foshan Metro stations
Railway stations in China opened in 2010
Guangzhou Metro stations